Around the Well is a compilation of out-of-print and previously unreleased tracks by the folk rock artist Iron & Wine, released on May 19, 2009. Iron & Wine toured in May 2009 in support of this release.

Track listing 
All tracks written by Sam Beam, except where noted.

Disc 1 
 "Dearest Forsaken" - 3:49
 "Morning" - 2:41
 "Loud as Hope" - 2:56
 "Peng! 33" - 3:28 (Stereolab)
 "Sacred Vision" - 3:19
 "Friends They Are Jewels" - 4:14
 "Hickory" - 4:35
 "Waitin' for a Superman" - 4:34 (Wayne Coyne, Michael Ivins, Steven Drozd)
 "Swans and the Swimming" - 3:24
 "Call Your Boys" - 3:47
 "Such Great Heights" - 4:11 (Ben Gibbard, Jimmy Tamborello)

Disc 2 
 "Communion Cups & Someone's Coat" - 2:02
 "Belated Promise Ring" - 3:45
 "God Made the Automobile" - 3:54
 "Homeward, These Shoes" - 1:34
 "Love Vigilantes" - 3:26 (Bernard Sumner, Peter Hook, Stephen Morris, Gillian Gilbert)
 "Sinning Hands" - 5:31
 "No Moon" - 4:15
 "Serpent Charmer" - 2:39
 "Carried Home" - 6:31
 "Kingdom of the Animals" - 5:05
 "Arms of a Thief" - 3:41
 "The Trapeze Swinger" - 9:31

The iTunes Store and Apple Music versions of the album also include a bonus track, Love Vigilantes (Alternate version).

References 

Iron & Wine albums
2009 compilation albums
Sub Pop compilation albums